ATEN International Co.(Ltd) is a Taiwanese multinational manufacturer of connectivity and access management hardware headquartered in Xizhi District, New Taipei, Taiwan. Its products include KVM switches, audiovisual switches and matrices, intelligent power distribution units, information technology management systems, and interface adapters. ATEN has subsidiaries in several countries and is the parent company of IOGEAR.

History
Founded in 1979, ATEN's first products became available in 1981. 

In 1999, ATEN became a public company and established IOGEAR, a US-based subsidiary with a focus on consumer electronics and information technology. 

In 2000, ATEN developed the first 4–port USB 2.0 hub, which became a USB testing standard for the USB Implementers Forum, Inc. 

ATEN went public in 2003 and has since remained the only listed KVM manufacturer in the world.

In 2010  ATEN began offering professional-grade audiovisual (VanCryst) and green energy (NRGence) products, respectively.

In 2012, ATEN collaborated with the National Taiwan University of Science and Technology to develop "iListen", software aimed at helping the hearing-impaired.  The following year, ATEN joined the HDBaseT Alliance and began developing video extenders and matrices featuring HDBaseT technology.

Operations
ATEN has subsidiaries in the United States (established in 1996), Belgium (2000), Japan (2004), the United Kingdom (2006), South Korea (2007), China (2007), and Australia (2015); a representative office in Russia (2013); factories in Taiwan and China (2008); and R&D centers in Taiwan, China, and Canada (1998).

Products
ATEN products use proprietary Application-specific integrated circuit (ASIC) technology, incorporating over 220 patents.

As of July 2015, ATEN holds 466 approved global patents.

 KVM 
 KVM Switches: Desktop, Cat 5, over IP, Matrix, Rack, Secure
 Computer Sharing Devices
 Extenders
 Modules & Accessories
 Management Software
 Serial Console Server

 Professional Audiovisual 
 Control System
 Matrix Switches: Modular, Video
 Extenders: HDBaseT, Optical, Wireless
 Splitters
 Adapters

 Energy Intelligence Rack PDU 
 Metered PDU: Ready, Outlet, Outlet-Switched, Outlet-Critical-Load
 Switched PDU
 Energy & DCIM Management Software
 Energy Monitoring Device
 KVM PDU

 Mobility and USB 
 Gamepad Emulator
 Host Controller Cards
 Tap (USB to Bluetooth Keyboard/Mouse Switch)
 USB: Converters, Extenders, Peripheral Switches
 USB/FireWire Hubs

 Data Communication 
 RS-232 Printer Switches
 Network Printer Switches
 RS-232 Interface Converters

 Cables 
 KVM: DVI, PS/2, PS/2-USB, USB
 AV: HDMI, DVI, DisplayPort, VGA
 Other: Cat 6

Environmental record
ATEN is ISO 14001:2004 UKAS compliant.

See also
List of companies of Taiwan
KVM
Smart environment
Video wall
Information technology management
Electrical cable
Power distribution units

References

External links
 Official Website
 IOGEAR Website

Manufacturing companies based in New Taipei
Networking hardware companies
System administration
Out-of-band management
Computer peripheral companies